Ina Anita Carter (March 31, 1933 – July 29, 1999) was an American singer who played upright bass, guitar, and autoharp. She performed with her sisters, Helen and June, and her mother, Maybelle, initially under the name The Carter Sisters and Mother Maybelle. Carter had three top ten hits as well as other charting singles. She was the first to record the songs "Blue Boy" and "Ring of Fire". Carter was also a songwriter, most notably co-writing the Johnny Cash hit "Rosanna's Going Wild."

Carter recorded for a number of labels, both as a solo artist and with her family, including RCA Victor, Cadence, Columbia, Audiograph, United Artists, Liberty and Capitol.

Biography
Born in Maces Spring, Virginia, she scored two top ten hits in 1951 with "Down the Trail of Achin' Hearts" and "Bluebird Island," both duets with Hank Snow. In 1962, she recorded "Love's Ring of Fire," written by her sister June and Merle Kilgore. After the song failed to make the charts, Johnny Cash recorded it as "Ring of Fire" in March 1963 with the horns and the Carter Sisters (along with Mother Maybelle). This version became a hit for Cash. 

She reached the top ten again in 1968 with "I Got You," a duet with Waylon Jennings. Carter also reached the top 50 with hits like "I'm Gonna Leave You" in 1966 and "Tulsa County" in 1971.

On March 26th, 1952, she appeared on The Kate Smith Evening Hour with her family band "The Carter Sisters and Mother Maybelle" as the first females to represent hillbilly/country music and Music City Nashville on national television. On April 23rd, she returned to the program, where she performed a duet with Hank Williams, on his song "I Can't Help It (If I'm Still in Love with You)". Then on May 21st, she became the first female star of the Grand Ole Opry to sing a solo on The Kate Smith Evening Hour when she sang "Just When I Needed You".

Marriages
Carter married fiddler Dale Potter in 1950 (marriage was annulled shortly thereafter), session musician Don Davis in 1953 (divorced and then remarried), and Bob Wootton (lead guitarist for Johnny Cash's band The Tennessee Three) in 1974 (divorced). She had two children, Lorrie Frances and John Christopher (Jay) Davis.

Death
Carter suffered from rheumatoid arthritis for many years, and the drugs used to treat it severely damaged her pancreas, kidneys, and liver. She died on July 29, 1999, at the age of 66, a year after eldest sister Helen and four years before middle sister June. She was under hospice care at the home of Johnny and June Carter Cash in Hendersonville, Tennessee. Her interment was in Hendersonville Memory Gardens in Hendersonville, Tennessee.

Album discography apart from Carter Family

Singles chart activity apart from Carter Family

Selected Studio & Guest Artist Appearances 

1933 births
1999 deaths
People from Scott County, Virginia
American women country singers
American country singer-songwriters
American folk singers
Apex Records artists
RCA Victor artists
Cash–Carter family
Country musicians from Virginia
Folk musicians from Virginia
Cadence Records artists
20th-century American singers
The Carter Family members
20th-century American women singers
Singer-songwriters from Virginia